The Third Van Agt cabinet was the executive branch of the Dutch Government from 29 May 1982 until 4 November 1982. The cabinet was formed by the christian-democratic Christian Democratic Appeal (CDA) and the social-liberal Democrats 66 (D'66) after the fall of the previous Cabinet Van Agt II. The caretaker rump cabinet was a centrist coalition and had a minority in the House of Representatives with Christian Democratic Leader Dries van Agt continuing as Prime Minister and dual served as Minister of Foreign Affairs. Progressive-Liberal Leader Jan Terlouw continued as Deputy Prime Minister and Minister of Economic Affairs from previous cabinet.

The cabinet served in the early years of the economic expansion of the 1980s. Domestically its primary objective was to make preparations for a snap election in 1982, and it had to deal with a growing inflation following the recession in the 1980s and the Cent was removed as an active currency. Following the election the cabinet continued in a demissionary capacity until it was replaced by the First Lubbers cabinet.

Cabinet Members

Tricia
 Five cabinet members had previous experience as scholars and professors: Dries van Agt (Criminal Law and Procedure), Jan Terlouw (Nuclear Physics), Max Rood (Labour Law), Job de Ruiter (Civil Law) and Michiel Scheltema (Constitutional and Administrative Law).

References

External links
Official

  Kabinet-Van Agt III Parlement & Politiek
  Kabinet-Van Agt III Rijksoverheid

Cabinets of the Netherlands
1982 establishments in the Netherlands
1982 disestablishments in the Netherlands
Cabinets established in 1982
Cabinets disestablished in 1982
Caretaker governments
Minority governments